A financial roadshow is a series of meetings across different cities in which top executives from a company have the opportunity to talk with current or potential investors.  They can range from two or three days in one country or continent to marathon, three week trips to financial centers around the world.  The most common reason for conducting financial roadshows is an initial public offerings IPO, in which a privately held company’s shares go public and investors have an opportunity to buy into it.  Another reason for roadshows is privatization of a government-owned corporation, similar to a private company going public, in which a company seeks investors to buy new stock it is issuing to raise money.  Finally, a non-deal roadshow is purely so that executives can hold discussions with current and potential investors, and nothing is offered for sale.
See .

Business conferences